Sumiya Dorjsuren (Mongolian: Доржсүрэнгийн Сумъяа, born 11 March 1991) is a Mongolian judoka. She competed in the 57 kg event at the 2012 Summer Olympics and lost in the first round. In 2015, she won her first World Championship medal, a bronze.  In the 2016 Olympics she won a silver medal in the same event and a gold medal in the 2017 World Judo Championships in Budapest.  In 2017 World Championships final, Dorjsürengiin defeated Tsukasa Yoshida who had beaten her in the Olympic final.  In 2018, Dorjsürengiin won the bronze medal at the World Championships, after an unexpected loss in the semi finals to Nekoda Smythe-Davis. She also competed in the women's 57 kg event at the 2020 Summer Olympics held in Tokyo, Japan.

Dorjsürengiin has also won multiple medals at the Asian Games (bronze in 2014 and 2018), Asian Championships (gold in 2016, bronze in 2012 and 2013) and is a four-time national champion.

Her life was the subject of 2017 Mongolian film White Blessing.

References

External links
 

1991 births
Living people
People from Uvs Province
Mongolian female judoka
Judoka at the 2012 Summer Olympics
Judoka at the 2016 Summer Olympics
Judoka at the 2020 Summer Olympics
Olympic silver medalists for Mongolia
Olympic judoka of Mongolia
Asian Games medalists in judo
Judoka at the 2014 Asian Games
Judoka at the 2018 Asian Games
Olympic medalists in judo
Medalists at the 2016 Summer Olympics
Asian Games bronze medalists for Mongolia
Medalists at the 2014 Asian Games
Medalists at the 2018 Asian Games
Universiade medalists in judo
World judo champions
Universiade gold medalists for Mongolia
Medalists at the 2015 Summer Universiade
21st-century Mongolian women